Orbit chairs are a type of recline chair designed by the Norwegian furniture designer  in 1976 for A/S Sykkylven kurvvarefabrikk in Sykkylven, Norway. The Orbit was designed in a functional style, with a distinct curved wooden frame work. Related to the Orbit is the Siesta chair and, to some degree, many of Relling'ss laminated wooden frame chairs such as Nordic, Tema, Rest, Optima, Bonus and "420". The chair was sold and marketed abroad by the Westnofa export organization. During Ingmar Relling's career he developed furniture for the Ekornes, Tennfjord Furniture Factory, Vatne Lenestolfabrikk, Hjellegjerde and Pedro which all have manufactured comparable design as the Orbit chair. The Orbit was among the first recline chairs where the laminated wooden frame allowed for slide movement to readjust the recline position. The Orbits upholstery where covered in cow-hide. Ingmar Relling  was in 1978 awarded the Jacob's Award and in 1999 he received the King's Medal in gold.

References 

1976 establishments in Norway
Chairs
Individual models of furniture